Tezpur is a Lok Sabha constituency in Assam under the Sonitpur District.

Assembly segments
Tezpur Lok Sabha constituency is  composed of the following assembly segments:

Members of Parliament

Election results

17th Lok Sabha: 2019 General Elections

See also
 Tezpur
 Gauhati (Lok Sabha constituency)
 List of Constituencies of the Lok Sabha

References

External links
Tezpur lok sabha  constituency election 2019 date and schedule

Lok Sabha constituencies in Assam